The House Opposite is a 1931 British crime film directed by Walter Summers and starring Henry Kendall, Frank Stanmore and Arthur Macrae. It was shot at Elstree Studios outside London. It was based on the 1931 novel The House Opposite by Joseph Jefferson Farjeon. It follows a police officer who pursues a gang of blackmailers.

Cast
 Henry Kendall as Hobart 
 Frank Stanmore as Ben 
 Celia Glyn as Nadine 
 Arthur Macrae as Randall 
 Wallace Geoffrey as Clitheroe 
 Renée Macready as Jessica 
 Abraham Sofaer as Fahmy 
 Molly Lamont as Doris 
 Charles Farrell as Wharton

References

Bibliography
 Low, Rachael. Filmmaking in 1930s Britain. George Allen & Unwin, 1985.
 Wood, Linda. British Films, 1927-1939. British Film Institute, 1986.

External links

1931 films
British crime films
British black-and-white films
Films shot at British International Pictures Studios
1930s English-language films
Films directed by Walter Summers
Films based on British novels
1931 crime films
1930s British films